Black Hat Jack: The True Life Adventures of Deadwood Dick as told by His Ownself is a novella written by American author Joe R. Lansdale. It tells the story about African-American cowboy Nat Love, also known as "Deadwood Dick" and his friend Black Hat Jack. The story is told from Nat's narrative point of view and takes place in the old west in 1874 during the Second Battle of Adobe Walls fought against various tribes of Native Americans.

Release information

It was published by Subterranean Press as an eBook and both a deluxe hardcover and limited edition. The hardcover has sold out.

References

External links
Author's official website
Publisher's Website
Ken Laager Website

Novels by Joe R. Lansdale
Novels set in Texas
Western (genre) novels
Fictional characters from Texas
Works by Joe R. Lansdale
Subterranean Press books